Nguyễn Công Phượng (born 21 January 1995) is a Vietnamese professional footballer who plays as a forward for J1 League club Yokohama FC and the Vietnam national team.

Nguyễn Công Phuợng is lauded as "Vietnamese Messi" by fans and the media due to his playing style and physique, Công Phượng is one of the most promising football talents in Vietnam. He is a product of HAGL – Arsenal JMG Academy and was promoted to Hoàng Anh Gia Lai senior team in 2015. Công Phượng was voted in 2015 as the 'Best Young Player of the Year.

Early life
Công Phượng was born on 21 January 1995 in Mỹ Sơn, Đô Lương District, Nghệ An Province. He is the fifth child out of seventeen children of Nguyễn Công Bảy and Nguyễn Thị Hoa; his family was poor when he was growing up.

Công Phượng has been interested in football since his childhood. Around the age of five he started to play football using a ball made of straw with his two-year-older brother Nguyễn Công Khoa, who later drowned in 2004 at the age of nine.

Club career

Early career
Công Phượng first started his proper football training at the age of ten when he was introduced to the Đô Lương district sport center by a local football coach Trương Quang Vinh. In 2006, he played for the Đô Lương District youth team at Nghệ An province's football competition. Impressed Sông Lam Nghệ An F.C.'s staff at the competition, Công Phượng was invited into Sông Lam Nghệ An F.C. youth team but after a month of trial, he wasn't accepted because he didn't meet the weight requirement. Công Phượng's weight at that time was only 25.4 kg, while the minimum requirement was 30 kg and 27 kg for special cases. In 2007, upon hearing the news about HAGL – Arsenal JMG Academy recruitment program, Công Phượng persuaded his parent to bring him to Pleiku, where HAGL – Arsenal JMG Academy based for the try-out. He was one of the only fourteen candidates who was accepted in to the academy out of about seven thousand candidates from all over the country in the first selection.

In June 2010, Công Phượng and Nguyễn Tuấn Anh were the only two players from HAGL JMG Academy that were invited to a fifteen days overseas training program in Cambodia. It was a training program for top players of JMG Academy from all over the globe.

In November 2012, Công Phượng along with Nguyễn Tuấn Anh, Lương Xuân Trường, Trần Hữu Đông Triều were four of the players from the academy received the invitation to train with Arsenal F.C. U–17 team. In the letter, Arsenal's performance supervisor, Steve Morrow stated that manager Arsène Wenger was impressed with the academy's players when they beat Oxford United F.C. U–17 team in January.

In winter 2014, HAGL – Arsenal JMG Academy team defeated Nepal U-21 3–0 in the International U-21 Thanh Niên Newspaper Cup final. A double by Cong Phuong secured the crown for his team.

Hoàng Anh Gia Lai

2015: First season

In 2015, Hoàng Anh Gia Lai revolutionized their first team, the club released most of their players in the senior team, only a few players was kept to guide young player from the academy. Công Phượng was promoted to first team along with other academy's player from the first selection. Công Phượng was given number 44 shirt instead of number 10 which he always wore when play for academy team and national U–19 team.

Công Phượng made his 2015 V.League 1 debut on 4 January 2015 at the opening game of the season against Sanna Khánh Hòa F.C. Hoàng Anh Gia Lai F.C. won this game 4–2 as Công Phượng scored twice. Công Phượng scored another brace at the eighth round against Dong Thap FC. Công Phượng finished 2015 season with six goals in twenty five appearances, he was club's leading goalscorer and had second most appearance. On 6 January 2016, Công Phượng won the 2015 young player of the year award, beating his club mate Nguyễn Tuấn Anh who won it the previous year and Hà Nội T&T F.C. player Đỗ Duy Mạnh.

2017 season

After one season in Japan, Công Phượng returned to Hoàng Anh Gia Lai to play in 2017 V.League 1. He scored 7 goals in this season.

2018 season: Good performances

2018 season is one of his best season for Hoàng Anh Gia Lai. Công Phượng scored 12 goals at league and 4 goals at domestic cup.

Although his club just finished 11th at the end of season, Phượng was still selected in V.League's Team of the season by his performances.

2021 season
Công Phượng returned to the club after his loan contract with Ho Chi Minh City F.C. get expired, followed by the arrival of the new coach Kiatisak Senamuang.

Mito HollyHock
In 2015, he has been loaned to Mito HollyHock for $100,000 in the J.League Division 2. On 7 May 2016, Công Phượng made his debut for Mito HollyHock, coming on as a substitute in the 87-minute in a match against Giravanz Kitakyushu that ended 1–0.

Incheon United
On 13 February 2019, he was loaned to K League 1 team Incheon United on a loan deal until the end of 2019 season. He made the debut for the club in the 2–1 victory against Gyeongnam, came as a substitute in the extra time of the second half.

On 1 June 2019, after just half season of the loan contract, he was released by Incheon United, which followed his desire. After 14 rounds of 2019 K League 1, he only played 401 minutes among 8 games for the team, and did not score any goal.

Sint-Truidense V.V.
On 30 June 2019, a Japanese newspaper named Sponichi confirmed that Công Phượng was going to join Sint-Truidense V.V. with loan contract for one year. He kicked off in the last friendly match of Sint Truiden before the new season when Sint Truiden host Lommel SK at home on 17 July (losing 1–2). He got the first officially match for Sint-Truiden in the 0–6 losing game against Club Brugge KV on 2 August, started playing in the 70th minute. However, he was excluded permanently from the squad after this game. He was mainly used for the youth team, had played 5 games and scored 1 goal against Club Brugge U-21 on 27 August 2019.

After the unsuccessful half-season at STVV, Công Phượng was expected to return to Vietnam at the end of 2019 and play for Hoang Anh Gia Lai. However, this team has sent him to Ho Chi Minh City F.C., the runner-up of 2019 V.League 1, by another loan contract.

Ho Chi Minh City F.C.
Công Phượng kicked off in a friendly match against South Korean side Jeonnam Dragons, losing 0–1. He scored his first goal for the club in an 2020 AFC Cup group stage against Yangon United F.C.

On 1 March 2020, at Thống Nhất Stadium, Công Phượng had the first time playing a final match at the club level against Hanoi FC at Vietnamese Super Cup. At the 20th minutes, he surprised the audience by a long shot to bring an advantage to his club. But with a higher level of skills and experience, Hanoi FC fastly controlled the match and scored 2 goals to win the match. After Trần Phi Sơn, Công Phượng was one of the few players performing well.

On 26 September 2020, Công Phượng impressively scored a brace in the 5–1 victory against Nam Định F.C., but later he got toe injured during the game which made him be almost absent for the rest of 2020 season. He finally resumed in the club's last match against Becamex Bình Dương on 7 November, coming as a substitute in 64th minutes.

Yokohama FC 
On 25 December 2022, Công Phượng was officially announced as a new signing of J1 League club Yokohama FC for the upcoming 2023 season.

International career

Vietnam U–19
Công Phượng was first called up to Vietnam U-19 team in September 2013 to participate in 2013 AFF U-19 Youth Championship. The team made it into the final with unbeaten run of five wins but eventually lost out to host nation Indonesia U–19 in the penalty shoot-out (7–6). Công Phượng scored twice in this competition.

Công Phượng was the top goal scorer at the 2014 AFC U-19 Championship qualification held in October 2013. He scored seven goals which include a brace against Australia U–19, the game ended with a shocking result of 5–1 win for U–19 Vietnam. His team finished at the top of the group with nine points and qualified for the final tournament.

At the 2014 AFF U-19 Youth Championship in September 2014, Công Phượng scored a stunning solo goal against Australia U–19 right at the end of the game which help his team achieve a 1–0 victory. The goal was voted as goal of tournament; this goal helped to raise Công Phượng's popularity even more. Công Phượng scored another goal in the game against U–19 Japan. His team made it into the final and ended up as runner up after lost the game 0–1 to Japan U–19.

Công Phượng captained his team at 2014 AFC U-19 Championship held in October 2014. They were put in a tough group with other Asia powerhouses, Japan U–19, South Korea U–19, and China U–19. His team failed to make it through the group stage with two losses and one draw. This is Công Phượng's last tournament with the U–19 side.

Vietnam U–23 and Olympic 
In March 2015, Công Phượng represented Vietnam U-23 at 2016 AFC U-23 Championship qualification. He scored four goals that helped the team to qualify for the final tournament in 2016.

Công Phượng was a part of Vietnam's squad that played at SEA Games 2015. His team won the bronze medal, Công Phượng contributed three goals, one of which against Malaysia was voted as goal of the tournament.

Công Phượng had a good individual performance at SEA Games 2017 by scoring 4 goals, but his team was unfortunately eliminated in the group stage. He also missed the penalty in the crucial game against Thailand, which lost a good chance for his team to bounce back, when Vietnam was being led 0–2.

Công Phượng scored four goals at 2018 AFC U-23 Championship qualification and one goal at 2018 AFC U-23 Championship against Iraq.  In this tournament, Công Phượng did a good job in his role as a "virtual striker" and helped Vietnam U-23 reach the final, which was a historic achievement of Vietnamese youth football in the continental level.

Công Phượng was in the Vietnam Olympic's squad participating in 2018 Asian Games, where his team successfully achieved the fourth place. Công Phượng played relatively well in the tournament by scoring 2 goals, but he also missed many good chances to score more goal. He especially missed 2 penalties in the opening game against Pakistan.

Vietnam national team
Công Phượng made his debut for the senior national team as the substitution on 77th min at 2018 FIFA World Cup qualification (AFC) game against Iraq on 8 October 2015. Five days later, he once again came from the substitution, but played the whole second-half in the match against Thailand.

He scored the first goal for the national team in the 3–2 victory of the friendly match against Indonesia on 8 November 2016.

Công Phượng was an important player of Vietnam's champions squad at 2018 AFF Championship when he scored 3 goals including 2 in group stage and 1 in semi-final, against Philippines.

Selected for the 2019 Asian Cup, he scored two goals in the continental tournament. His first goal of the tournament in the first match against Iraq where he scored the second goal of Vietnam, although Vietnam were defeated 2–3. In the round of 16 on 20 January 2019, Công Phượng had equalized against Jordan in the early second half, before Vietnam eliminated the Al-Nashama on penalty shoot-out; thus contributing to the very good course of the Golden Dragons, quarter finalists to everyone's surprise of the continental edition.

In the final match of 2019 King's Cup, he missed a penalty shoot-out against Curacao, thus confirming the overall victory of the Caribbean team.

Career statistics

Club

International

International goals

U-19

U-22/U-23

Vietnam
Scores and results list Vietnam's goal tally first.

Outside football
Công Phượng officially got married on 6 June 2020.

Age fabrication accusation
The rumours that Công Phượng had fabricated his age to play in younger age football competition began to circulate soon after his team won the 2014 International U-21 Thanh Niên Newspaper Cup. It started with the newspaper Thể Thao 24h published on 8 November 2014, three different documents showing three different date of birth of Công Phượng and an interview with a former Hoàng Anh Gia Lai F.C. youth team's player Bùi Văn Phúc said that both him and Công Phượng had their birth certificate redone, in his case it changed 1994 to 1996 and Công Phượng from 1993 to 1995. Bùi Văn Phúc later denied the newspaper's claim but the newspaper affirmed they told the truth and have recording of the conversation that they were willing to show if necessary.

On 12 November, after two days working in Nghệ An Province, Vietnam Football Federation published Công Phượng's birth certificate that showed he was born on 21 January 1995. On 16 November 2014, VTV Chuyển Động 24h broadcast a program pointing out problems with the birth certificate, the program also published more documents to back up the claim that Công Phượng born in 1993 and asked Công Phượng to speak up. On 17 November, in an interview with Người Lao Động newspaper, Công Phượng made no comment when asked about the accusation he said that he doesn't have permission from the club to answer.

On 18 November, after investigating the matter, Đô Lương District's Justice Committee Division concluded that Công Phượng was born on 21 January 1995. Nghệ An Province's Justice Department reached the same conclusion on 5 December.

On 30 December, VTV was fined 15 million Vietnamese Dong and ordered to issue a public correction by the Ministry of Information and Communications for broadcasting wrongful information about Công Phượng's age, the newspaper Thể Thao 24h was also fined 10 million Vietnamese Dong and ordered to issue a public correction.

Honours
Ho Chi Minh City
Vietnamese Super Cup runner-up: 2020

Vietnam
AFF Championship: 2018
VFF Cup: 2022
King's Cup runner-up: 2019

Vietnam U23/Olympic
AFC U-23 Championship runner-up: 2018
Asian Games fourth place: 2018
VFF Cup: 2018

Vietnam U19
AFF U-19 Youth Championship runner-up: 2013, 2014
Hassanal Bolkiah Trophy runner-up: 2014

Individual
Vietnamese Young Player of the Year: 2015
Vietnamese Most favorite player: 2017, 2018

References

External links

Express official website
Youtube – Nguyễn Công Phượng U–19 Goal skill
Youtube – Nguyễn Công Phượng Goal skill
Youtube – Nguyễn Công Phượng skill
Youtube – Công Phượng AFC U–23 Championship Qualifier

1995 births
Living people
Vietnamese footballers
Association football forwards
V.League 1 players
J2 League players
Belgian Pro League players
J1 League players
Hoang Anh Gia Lai FC players
Mito HollyHock players
Incheon United FC players
Sint-Truidense V.V. players
Yokohama FC players
Vietnamese expatriate footballers
Expatriate footballers in Japan
Expatriate footballers in South Korea
Expatriate footballers in Belgium
Nguyễn Công Phượng
Nguyễn Công Phượng
Vietnam international footballers
People from Nghệ An province
Southeast Asian Games bronze medalists for Vietnam
Southeast Asian Games medalists in football
Footballers at the 2018 Asian Games
2019 AFC Asian Cup players
Competitors at the 2015 Southeast Asian Games
Competitors at the 2017 Southeast Asian Games
Asian Games competitors for Vietnam